Biernatki may refer to the following places in Poland:
Biernatki, Lower Silesian Voivodeship (south-west Poland)
Biernatki, Kuyavian-Pomeranian Voivodeship (north-central Poland)
Biernatki, Podlaskie Voivodeship (north-east Poland)
Biernatki, Kalisz County in Greater Poland Voivodeship (west-central Poland)
Biernatki, Poznań County in Greater Poland Voivodeship (west-central Poland)